Saumalkol is a salt lake in Karkaraly District, Karaganda Region, Kazakhstan.

The nearest inhabited place is Saumalkol railway station  to the southwest. The lake is a  Important Bird Area part of the Korgalzhyn Nature Reserve.

Geography
Saumalkol is an endorheic lake in the central Kazakh Uplands. It lies at the feet of the southern slopes of the Ayr Mountains. Located  to the west of the western end of lake Karasor, it is the second largest of the lakes of a vast depression. Its water is salty and hard and the bottom of the lake is muddy, having a smell of hydrogen sulfide. 

The lake is fed mainly by snow and groundwater. They dry up in the summer. There is a small peninsula in the northern shore.

Flora and fauna
Steppe vegetation grows in the area surrounding the lake. There is a narrow belt of reeds along the shoreline. There are no fish in the waters. The endangered white-headed duck and the common goldeneye are among the migratory bird species found in Saumalkol.

See also 
List of lakes of Kazakhstan

References

External links
Озера и реки Казахстана (in Russian)
Record numbers of White-headed Duck in Kazakhstan
Birds of Kazakhstan. Rare Birds Records

Lakes of Kazakhstan
Endorheic lakes of Asia
Karaganda Region
Kazakh Uplands
Important Bird Areas of Kazakhstan

ru:Саумалколь (озеро, Каршигалинский сельский округ)